Yll or YLL may refer to:

Lloydminster Airport, Canada, by IATA code
Years of Life Lost, an estimate of the average years a person would have lived if they had not died prematurely
Yuen Long stop, MTR Light Rail stop in Hong Kong, by station code

People with the given name
Yll Hoxha (born 1987), Kosovar-Albanian footballer
Yll Limani (born 1994), Kosovar-Albanian singer and songwriter
Yll Rugova (born 1984), Kosovar political activist